Jesus is a Palestinian (Dutch:  Jezus is een Palestijn) is a 1999 Dutch comedy written and directed by Lodewijk Crijns (1970). The parody on religious fanaticism and millennialism, which involves the topics of self mutilation, incest, and euthanasia, is the director's first full-length movie. It premiered at the 1999 International Film Festival Rotterdam.

Plot
Natasha (Kim van Kooten) goes to Limburg to collect her brother Ramses (Hans Teeuwen), who has joined a sect, prying him from the cult so he can consent to cutting their father's life support. The cult's leader Pieter Bouwman frowns upon sexual activity and, to prevent sex from happening, they have put a kind of lock, self-applied by way of piercing on the male member's penises. Ramses slowly develops a mind of his own and falls in love with Natasha's roommate, Lonneke (Dijn Blom). Ramses finds out that his sister and the nursing home staff are essentially trying to kill his father (Peer Mascini), and ends up delivering his father to a crackpot zealous Palestinian who prophesies the return of Christ. In the meantime, the cult is also out to get Ramses back, but Ramses now is unwilling to return to mandatory celibacy.

Reception
According to NRC Handelsblad, the film was a flop. The Volkskrant critic, in a sometimes positive review, summarized the movie as "occasionally funny, but mostly superficial." David Rooney reviewed the movie for Variety and commented positively on "Crijns' spirited direction and the appealing cast."

Cast
Hans Teeuwen - Ramses
Kim van Kooten - Natasja
Dijn Blom - Lonneke
Peer Mascini - Father
Najib Amhali - Rashid
Pieter Bouwman - Sect leader
Anis de Jong - Guru
Tygo Gernandt - Steven
Micha Hulshof
Orlando MacBean - Abraham
Sandra Mattie - Girl making out in room
Ferri Somogyi - Bob
Waldemar Torenstra - Roy
Ruben van der Meer - Osiris

References

External links 
 

Dutch comedy films
1999 films
1990s Dutch-language films
Films about self-harm